Douglas John Mulray (born 1 December 1951) is an Australian comedian, radio and television presenter. He grew up in the Sydney Northern Beaches suburb of Dee Why.

Radio career
Mulray began his career at 2AD in Armidale, after doing a broadcasting course at the Digamae (Rod Muir's) Radio School. From there he grafted his way south, securing a spot with Central Coast station 2GO Gosford. During the mid-1970s he worked on 3AW Melbourne with a program called "Mulray & The Man". In the late 1970s, he started a permanent job in Sydney with Australian Broadcasting Corporation's alternative rock station 2JJ (later Triple J), where he built up a sizeable following. In 1982 he was poached by a new station, Triple M.

After a break from Triple M, he worked for a brief time in the PM drive time slot on 2SM with Peter FitzSimons before moving to Sydney radio station 2WS eventually leaving that station in July 1999. He never regained the ratings he enjoyed at his former station Triple M.

In 2014, industry analyst Radio Today rated his breakfast show as the third best Australian metro FM breakfast show of all time.

Television career
Outside of radio, Mulray has also featured on Australian TV shows such as Beauty and the Beast, and in 1992 hosted the infamous Australia's Naughtiest Home Videos, with the show's only episode pulled from broadcast by Nine Network owner Kerry Packer after 34 minutes. Mulray was fired and banned from the Nine Network as a result, although he would later return to Nine in 2002 to be a part of the special “Brian Henderson Toasted and Roasted” (even adding a subtle joke about his ban while Packer was in the audience), and judge on the 2005 series StarStruck (shortly after Packer's death in December that year). On Full Frontal, this was parodied with a skit of Mulray hosting a lottery draw, making sexual remarks as the balls drop.

He was also the host of the eponymously titled program Mulray, which ran briefly in the early 1990s on the Seven Network. He also hosted Beauty and the Beast on Network Ten for a brief stint in 2002. In the late 1980s and early 1990s, Doug was part of the Channel Seven Australian Touring Car Championship and Bathurst 1000 commentary team headed up by Mike Raymond and Neil Crompton until Seven lost the rights in 1997.

In August 2008, Australia's Naughtiest Home Videos was re-aired on the Nine Network. Mulray reportedly refused requests from Nine management to reappear as the host. One commentator wrote that "it may be that Mulray, a very smart man, knew he would have been open to a few cruel comparisons between the relatively youthful Mulray of 1992 and the solitary Mulray of 2008. The years have not been particularly kind."

Discography

Studio albums

Singles

Filmography
As producer / director:
 2004 Kurt Elling: Live at the Basement (TV Movie documentary) (executive producer) 
 2003 Steve Poltz: Live at the Basement (Video documentary) (executive producer) 
 2000 The Basement (TV Series) (director, also executive producer of one episode) 
 2000 The Breakfast Show (executive producer)

As actor:
 1980 Making Weekend of Summer Last - Narrator

As himself:
 1989 60 Minutes Episode dated 29 April 1989 (TV Series) 
 1992 Australia's Funniest Home Videos (TV Series) 
 1992 Australia's Naughtiest Home Videos (TV Series)
 1994 Mulray (TV Series) 
 1996 Beauty and the Beast (TV Series) 
 2000 The Basement (TV Series) 
 2002 The Fat Episode #5.2 (TV Series) 
 2005 Starstruck (TV Series) 
 2007 Getaway 15th Birthday Special (TV Series)

Awards and nominations

ARIA Music Awards
The ARIA Music Awards are a set of annual ceremonies presented by Australian Recording Industry Association (ARIA), which recognise excellence, innovation, and achievement across all genres of the music of Australia. They commenced in 1987.

! 
|-
| rowspan="2"| 1994 || Nice Legs Shame About the Fez || ARIA Award for Best Comedy Release ||  || 
|-

References

External links
 

Triple J announcers
Living people
1951 births
People educated at Manly Selective Campus
Triple M presenters